A cable ferry (including the terms chain ferry, swing ferry, floating bridge, or punt) is a ferry that is guided (and in many cases propelled) across a river or large body of water by cables connected to both shores. Early cable ferries often used either rope or steel chains, with the latter resulting in the alternative name of chain ferry. Both of these were largely replaced by wire cable by the late 19th century.

Types

There are three types of cable ferry: the reaction ferry, which uses the power of the river to tack across the current; the powered cable ferry, which uses engines or electric motors (e.g., the Canby Ferry in the U.S. State of Oregon) to wind itself across; and the hand-operated type, such as the Stratford-upon-Avon chain ferry in the UK and the Saugatuck Chain Ferry in Saugatuck, Michigan, United States.

Powered cable ferries use powered wheels or drums on board the vessel to pull itself along by the cables. The chains or wire ropes can be used with a sufficient amount of slack to allow sinking below the surface as the ferry moves away, allowing other vessels to pass without becoming snared or trapped. Chain ferries in strong tidal currents use two chains, those in inland rivers often only one chain on the upstream side. Some cable ferries use a wire rope on the upstream side in order to hold the position and a chain on the downstream side for propulsion.

A special type are electrically powered overhead-cable ferries like Straussee Ferry, which have an onboard propulsion unit and can float free, but are connected to the overhead wire for the power supply, using an electrical cable that slides along the cable as the ferry moves.

A very rare type are cable-ferries that are not propelled by themselves but rather are pulled from land side. An example of such a cable ferry was the Kungälv – Fästningsholmen ferry in Sweden.  Today, the Jonen ferry in the Netherlands is pulled by a winch on the banks. These cable ferries can be operated electrically without having to provide electricity by rechargeable batteries or an overhead wire. Saving the weight of the engine onboard, these ferries can also be operated using less energy.

Two or more ferries can be provided in order to increase availability and capacity and as a backup during maintenance, as with the Torpoint Ferry.

History

Cable ferries have probably been used to cross rivers and similar bodies of water since before recorded history. Examples of ferry routes using this technology date back to the 13th century (Hampton Ferry in England).

In the early 1900s a cable ferry designed by Canadian engineer William Pitt was installed on the Kennebecasis River near Saint John, New Brunswick in Canada. There are now eight cable ferries along the Saint John River system in southern New Brunswick. In Canada a cable ferry is proposed to transport automobiles across the Ottawa River in Ontario. There are several in British Columbia: two on the Fraser, one at Lytton, one at Big Bar, three on Arrow Lakes. A suspended cable ferry worked until the 1980s in Boston Bar. A small seasonal reaction ferry carries cars across the Rivière des Prairies from Laval, Quebec (Sainte-Dorothée neighbourhood) to Île Bizard (part of Montreal).

Cable ferries were particularly prominent in early transportation in the Sacramento Delta of California. Dozens of cable ferries operated on the Columbia River in the US northwest, and most have been rendered obsolete by bridges. A suspended cable ferry for railway cars crossed the American River in Northern California.

Most of the road crossings of the Murray River in South Australia are cable ferries operated by the state government using diesel engines. The platforms at the ends can be moved up or down according to the water level. At one time, cable ferries were a primary means of automobile transportation in New South Wales in Australia. In Tasmania, for a century before 1934, the Risdon Punt at Hobart was the only fixed method of crossing the Derwent River within Hobart city limits.

In the fishing village of Tai O on Lantau Island, Hong Kong, the Tai O Ferry (橫水渡) crossed the Tai O River before a bascule bridge was built.

The largest and busiest cable ferry is the Torpoint Ferry in Plymouth, England. It was first converted to cable operation in 1831 and currently operates 3 ferries, carrying 8000 vehicles per day.

Ownership

The earliest punts were privately owned by local landowners, and charged a toll. As governments started to build roads, they started to build and operate punts as required. Private punts might be bought out, or made to impose more standard tolls.

List of cable ferry routes
Current cable ferry routes include:

Albania
Butrint Ferry, across the Vivari Channel near Butrint

Australia

Berowra Waters Ferry, at Berowra Waters in New South Wales
Blanchetown Punt
Bombah Point Ferry, at Bombah Point
Cadell Ferry, across the Murray River at Cadell, South Australia
Daintree River Ferry, across the Daintree River in Queensland
Hibbard Ferry, across the Hastings River near Port Macquarie, New South Wales
Lawrence Ferry, across the Clarence River in New South Wales
Lower Portland Ferry, across the Hawkesbury River near the village of Lower Portland, New South Wales
Lyrup Ferry, across the Murray River at Lyrup, South Australia
Mannum Ferry, across the Murray River at Mannum, South Australia (two parallel ferries)
Moggill Ferry, across the Brisbane River near Ipswich, Queensland
Morgan Ferry, across the Murray River in Morgan, South Australia
Mortlake Ferry, across the Parramatta River in Sydney, New South Wales
Narrung Ferry, across the Murray River at Narrung, South Australia
Noosa River Ferry, across the Noosa River in Queensland
Purnong Ferry, across the Murray River in Purnong, South Australia
Raymond Island Ferry, chain ferry from Paynesville to Raymond Island in Victoria
Sackville Ferry, across the Hawkesbury River near the village of Sackville, New South Wales
Settlement Point Ferry, across the Hastings River near Port Macquarie, New South Wales
Speewa Ferry, across the Murray River between New South Wales and Victoria at Speewa
Swan Reach Ferry, across the Murray River in Swan Reach, South Australia
Tailem Bend Ferry, across the Murray River in Tailem Bend, South Australia
Ulmarra Ferry, across the Clarence River in New South Wales
Waikerie Ferry, across the Murray River in Waikerie, South Australia
Walker Flat Ferry, across the Murray River in Walker Flat, South Australia
Webbs Creek Ferry, across the Hawkesbury River in the village of Wisemans Ferry, New South Wales
Wellington Ferry, across the Murray River in Wellington, South Australia
Wisemans Ferry, across the Hawkesbury River in the village of Wisemans Ferry, New South Wales
Wymah Ferry, across the Murray River between New South Wales and Victoria

Austria
Rollfähre Klosterneuburg, across the Danube River at Klosterneuburg
Drahtseilbrücke Ottensheim, across the Danube River at Ottensheim

Belize
Xunantunich Ferry, across the Mopan River at Xunantunich

Canada

Adams Lake Cable Ferry, across Adams Lake in British Columbia
Baynes Sound Connector, across Baynes Sound from Buckley Bay to Denman Island in British Columbia. The longest cable ferry in the world at the time of its opening.
Belleisle Bay Ferry, across Belleisle Bay in New Brunswick
Big Bar Ferry, across the Fraser River at Big Bar, British Columbia
Bleriot Ferry, across the Red Deer River near Drumheller, Alberta
Clarkboro Ferry, across the South Saskatchewan River near Saskatoon, Saskatchewan
Country Harbour Ferry, across Country Harbour near Port Bickerton, Nova Scotia.
Crowfoot Ferry, across the Bow River in Alberta
Ecolos Ferry, across Ottawa River between Clarence-Rockland ON and Thurso QC
Englishtown Ferry, across the mouth of St. Anns Bay in Nova Scotia
Estuary Ferry, across the South Saskatchewan River near Estuary, Saskatchewan
Evandale Ferry, across the Saint John River in New Brunswick
Finnegan Ferry, across the Red Deer River in Alberta
Gagetown Ferry, across the Saint John River in New Brunswick
GladeFerry, across the Kootenay River in British Columbia
Gondola Point Ferry, across the Kennebecasis River in New Brunswick
Hampstead Ferry, across the Saint John River in New Brunswick
Harrop Cable Ferry, across Kootenay Lake in British Columbia
Howe Island ferries, across the Bateau Channel, St Lawrence River, Ontario
Kennebecasis Island Ferry, across the Kennebecasis River in New Brunswick
Klondyke Ferry, across the Athabasca River in Alberta
LaHave Cable Ferry, across the LaHave River in Nova Scotia
Lancer Ferry, across the South Saskatchewan River near Lancer, Saskatchewan
Laval-sur-le-Lac Île-Bizard Ferry, across the Rivière des Prairies between Montreal and Laval, Quebec
Lemsford Ferry, across the South Saskatchewan River near Lemsford, Saskatchewan
Little Fort Ferry, across the North Thompson River in British Columbia
Little Narrows Cable Ferry, across the Little Narrows of Whycocomagh Bay in Nova Scotia
Low Bar Ferry, across the Fraser River at High Bar, British Columbia
Lytton Ferry, across the Fraser River at Lytton, British Columbia
McLure Ferry, across the North Thompson River in British Columbia
Needles Cable Ferry, across Lower Arrow Lake in British Columbia
Quyon Ferry, across Ottawa River between Fitzroy Harbour ON & Quyon, QC
Riverhurst Ferry, across Lake Diefenbaker, Saskatchewan
Rosevear Ferry, across the McLeod River near Edson, Alberta
Simcoe Island Ferry, between Wolfe Island and Simcoe Island, St Lawrence River, Ontario
Usk Ferry, across the Skeena River at Usk, British Columbia
Westfield Ferry, across the Saint John River in New Brunswick

Chile
Balseo de San Javier, across San Pedro River, Los Ríos Region.

Croatia 
Medsave Ferry, across the Sava River (Medsave–Zaprešić) in Zagreb County, overhead cable
Otočanka Ferry, across the Sava River (Otok Samoborski–Savski Marof) in Zagreb County, overhead cable
Oborovo, across the Sava River (Oborovo–Vrbovo Posavsko) in Zagreb County, overhead cable
Martinska ves, across the Sava River (Dubrovčak Lijevi–Dubrovčak Desni) in Sisak-Moslavina County, overhead cable
Tišina, across the Sava River (Tišina Kaptolska–Tišina Erdedska) in Sisak-Moslavina County, overhead cable
Sunjanka, across the Sava River (Graduša Posavska–Lukavec Posavski) in Sisak-Moslavina County, overhead cable
Kratečko, across the Sava River (Kratečko–Sunjsko Selište) in Sisak-Moslavina County, overhead cable
Pitomača Jelkuš Ferry, across the Drava River, in Virovitica–Podravina County
Pitomača Križnica, across the Drava River, in Virovitica–Podravina County
Osijek Zoološki vrt, across the Drava River, Osijek-Baranja County

Czech Republic
Dolní Žleb Ferry, reactive ferry across the Elbe at Dolní Žleb near Děčín, lower cable
Vrané nad Vltavou – Strnady, reactive ferry across the Vltava before Prague, with overhead cable
Klecánky – Roztoky ferry over the Vltava under Prague, secured by overhead cable
Máslovice, Dol - Libčice ferry over the Vltava under Prague, secured by lower cable
Lužec nad Vltavou ferry over the Vltava, secured by overhead cable
Zlenice - Senohraby swimpool, ferry over the Sázava river, overhead security cable installed but usually unused
Oseček ferry, Elbe river, formerly secured by overhead cable, now without it
Kazín ferry, Berounka river, 1992–2007 propelled through lower chain, since 2015 unsecured boat
Nadryby ferry, Berounka river, secured by the overhead cable
Darová ferry, Berounka river, propelled through the overhead cable

Denmark
Østre Ferry, across Isefjord between Hammer Bakke and Orø. Uses cables for steering, but propellers for propulsion.
Udbyhøj Ferry, across Randers Fjord.

Estonia
Kavastu Ferry, across Emajõgi in Kavastu (manual mechanism, more than century old flywheel)

Finland

Ahvionsaari Ferry, from Kiviapaja to Ahvionsaari in Savonlinna
Alassalmi Ferry, across Alassalmi strait on lake Oulujärvi between Manamansalo island and mainland
Arvinsalmi Ferry, across Arvinsalmi strait between the municipalities of Rääkkylä and Liperi
Barösund Ferry, across Barösund strait between Barölandet and Orslandet islands
Bergö Ferry, in Bergö
Eskilsö Ferry
Föri in Turku
Hanhivirta Ferry, in Enonkoski
Hirvisalmi Ferry, across Hirvisalmi strait between the mainland and Paalasmaa island in Juuka
Hämmärönsalmi Ferry, across Hämmärönsalmi strait (Rimito-Hanka) in Rimito, Nådendal (part of r. road 1890)
Högsar Ferry, between Högsar and Storlandet islands in Nagu, Pargas (part of r. road 12019)
Karhun Cable Ferry, between the mainland and the island of Karhu, Ii
Keistiö Ferry, between Keistiö and Iniö islands in Iniö, Pargas
Kietävälänvirta Ferry, between Partalansaari and Viljakansaari in Puumala (part of road 15176)
Koivukanta Ferry, to Kesamonsaari in Savonlinna
Kokonsaari Ferry, from Kesamonsaari to Kokonsaari in Savanlinna
Kivimo Ferry, between Roslax on mainland Houtskär and Kivimo islands in Houtskär, Pargas
Kokkila Ferry, between Kokkila on the mainland and Angelniemi on Kimitoön (part of r. road 1835)
Kuparonvirta Ferry, between Hirvensalo and Anttola in Mikkeli (part of road 15147)
Kyläniemi Ferry, between Utula and Kyläniemi
Lövö Ferry, between Kasnäs and Lövö islands in Hitis, Kimitoön (part of r. road 1830)
Mossala Ferry, between Björkö and Mossala islands in Houtskär, Pargas (part of regional road 12003)
Pellinki Ferry, between the mainland and the island of Pellinki
Pettu Ferry, between Pettu and Utö islands in Finby, Salo
Pikkarala Ferry, across Oulujoki river in Pikkarala, Oulu
Potkusalmi Ferry, to Ritosaari in Savonlinna
Puutossalmi Ferry, in Kuopio
Rongonsalmi Ferry, between Viljakansaari and Lieviskä in Puumala, (part of road 15170)
Saverkeit Ferry, between mainland Houtskär and Västra Saverkeit islands in Houtskär, Pargas (part of r. road 12005)
Skagen Ferry, between Jumo and Iniö islands in Iniö, Pargas (part of r. road 12230)
Skåldö Ferry, between Degerö and Skåldö islands in Ekenäs, Raseborg
Tappuvirta Ferry, Tappuvirrantie
Tuohisaari Ferry, from Liistonsaari to Tuohisaari in Savonlinna
Vartsala Ferry, between Vartsala and Kivimaa islands in Kustavi (part of r. road 192)
Vånö Ferry, between Vånö and Attu islands in Pargas (part of r. road 12027)

Åland
Björkölinjen, across Björkösund strait between the islands of Korsö (in Kumlinge municipality) and Bockholm (in Brändö m.)
Embarsundlinjen, across Embarsund strait in Föglö municipality, between the islands of Finholma and Jyddö
Töftölinjen, across Prästösund strait between the islands of Töftö (in Vårdö municipality) and Prästö (in Sund m.)
Seglingelinjen, across the strait between the islands of Seglinge and Snäckö (both in Seglinge village in Kumlinge municipality)
Simskälalinjen, across the strait between the islands of Alören and Östra Simskäla (both in Vårdö municipality)
Ängsösundlinjen, across Ängösund strait between the islands of Lumparland (in Lumparland municipality) and Ängö (in Vårdö m.)

France
Bac du Sauvage Ferry, across a branch of the Rhône in the Camargue

Gambia
Bansang Ferry, across the River Gambia at Bansang in the Central River Division

Germany

Aken Ferry, across the Elbe at Aken in Saxony-Anhalt
Barby Ferry, across the Elbe at Barby in Saxony-Anhalt
Caputh Ferry, across the Havel at Caputh in Brandenburg
Coswig Ferry, across the Elbe at Coswig in Saxony-Anhalt
, across the Rhine from Lottstetten in Baden-Württemberg to Marthalen in Switzerland
Ferchland Grieben Ferry, across the Elbe between Ferchland and Grieben in Saxony-Anhalt
, across the Oste at Gräpel in Lower Saxony
Ketzin Cable Ferry, across the Havel at Ketzin in Brandenburg
Kiewitt Ferry, across the Havel at Potsdam in Brandenburg
Maintal–Dörnigheim Ferry, across the Main near Maintal in Hesse
Friesenheimer Insel – Sandhofen Ferry, across an old arm of the Rhine in Mannheim
Pritzerbe Ferry, across the Havel between Havelsee and Kützkow in Brandenburg
Rathen Ferry, across the Elbe at Rathen in Saxony
Räbel Ferry, across the Elbe between Räbel and Havelberg in Saxony-Anhalt
Rothenburg Ferry, across the Saale at Rothenburg in Saxony-Anhalt
Sandau Ferry, across the Elbe at Sandau in Saxony-Anhalt
Straussee Ferry, across the Straussee at Strausberg in Brandenburg
Teterower See Ferry, to an island in the Teterower See in Mecklenburg-Vorpommern
Veckerhagen Ferry, across the Weser between Veckerhagen in Hesse and Hemeln in Lower Saxony
Westerhüsen Ferry, across the Elbe at Magdeburg in Saxony-Anhalt

Hong Kong

Nam Sang Wai Ferry, at Nam Sang Wai in northwestern New Territories

Hungary

One cable ferry across the Danube between Csepel and Soroksár, in Budapest
A cable ferry crosses the Tisza between Tiszalök and Tiszatardos

Ireland
A cable ferry serves Little Island and Waterford Castle in the River Suir

Italy
Two cable ferries across the port of Cesenatico, in Romagna
One cable ferry across the port of Bellaria-Igea Marina, in Romagna
An engineless cable ferry (Traghetto di Leonardo) between Imbersago (Lecco) e Villa d'Adda (Bergamo), in Lombardia, in the Ecomuseo Adda di Leonardo da Vinci river museum
Another "Traghetto di Leonardo" across the Tevere river, in Lazio, in the Riserva Naturale di Nazzano natural reserve

Mozambique

Ferry across Shire River, 37 km south of Malawi's southernmost border

Netherlands

There are more than 100 cable ferries in the Netherlands, 11 of which use a floating cable with a single anchorage. The larger ones are usually powered by a diesel-powered screw propeller, the smaller ones often use the cable for propulsion. Most of the larger cable ferries angle themselves in the stream to gain part of their propulsion from the current, as a reaction ferry.

Some examples:
Cuijk ferry, across the Meuse at Cuijk
Genemuiden ferry, across the Zwarte Water at Genemuiden
Jonen ferry, across the Walengracht at Jonen, only taking foot passengers and cyclists, winched to the other bank by an electric motor on one of the banks.
Lexkesveer, across the Nederrijn near Wageningen, first mentioned in 1426
Oijen Ferry, across the Meuse at Oijen
Wijhe Ferry, across the IJssel at Wijhe
Wijk bij Duurstede ferry, across the Lek. This one uses a floating cable.

New Zealand
Tuapeka Mouth Ferry, in Tuapeka – South Island, on the Clutha River

Norway
Fjone ferry, across lake Nisser in Nissedal, Telemark
Espevær Ferry, in Bømlo, Hordaland
Duesund–Masfjordnes, in Nordhordland
Mjånes-Hisarøy, in Gulen, Sogn og Fjordane

Poland

Biechowy Ferry, across the Warta between Biechowy and Piersk
Borusowa Ferry, across the Vistula between Borusowa and Nowy Korczyn road no. 973
Brody Ferry, across the Oder at Brody road no. 280
Brzeg Dolny Ferry, across the Oder between Brzeg Dolny and Głoska
Ciszyca Ferry, across the Vistula between Tarnobrzeg and Ciszyca road no. 758
Czchów Ferry, across the Dunajec between Czchów and Piaski Drużków
Czeszewo Ferry, across the Warta at Czeszewo
Dębno Ferry, across the Warta between Dębno and Orzechowo
Gniew Ferry, across the Vistula between Gniew and Janowo road no. 510
Grzegorzowice Ferry, across the Oder between Grzerorzowice and Ciechowice road no. 421
Janowiec Ferry, across the Vistula between Kazimierz Dolny and Janowiec
Korzeniewo Ferry, across the Vistula between Korzeniewo and Opalenie road no. 232
Kozubów Ferry, across the Warta between Kozubów and Osina
Krzemienna Ferry, across the San between Krzemienna and Jabłonica Ruska
Milsko Ferry, across the Oder between Milsko and Przewóz road no. 282
Nozdrzec Ferry, across the San between Nozdrzec and Dąbrówka Starzeńska
Opatowiec Ferry, across the Vistula between Opatowiec and Ujście Jezuickie
Otfinów Ferry, across the Dunajec between Otfinów and Pasieka Otfinowska
Pogorzelica Ferry, across the Warta between Pogorzelica and Nowa Wieś Podgórna
Połaniec Ferry, across the Vistula between Połaniec and Gliny Małe
Połęcko Ferry, across the Oder between Połęcko and Chlebowo road no. 138
Pomorsko Ferry, across the Oder at Pomorsko road no. 281
Siedliszowice Ferry, across the Dunajec between Siedliszowice and Wietrzychowice
Sławsk Ferry, across the Warta between Sławsk and Węglewskie Holendry
Świniary Ferry, across the Vistula between Baranów Sandomierski and Świniary road no. 872
Waki Ferry, across the Warta at Waki

Slovakia 
Perec Ferry, across the Perec distributary of the river Hron, between Starý Tekov and Nový Tekov in Levice district - Foot ferry, came into use in the late 18th century and ceased operations in 2014, replaced by a bridge.

South Africa

Malgas Ferry, across the Breede River at Malgas, Western Cape

South Korea
Abai village ferry in Sokcho

Spain
Pas de barca de Flix, across the Ebro river, in Flix, Catalonia
Pas de barca de Miravet, across the Ebro river, in Miravet, Catalonia

Sweden

, in Lake Mälaren from Munsö to Adelsö
, in Lake Revsund from Ammer to Stavre
, between Ängön and Fruvik on Bokenäset
, in Lake Mälaren from Oknö to Arnö
, across Lule River from Avan to Norra Sunderbyn
, across Djupträsket from Sandudden to Boheden
, from Malmön to Roparöbacken
Bojarkilen Ferry, across Bojarkilen in Strömstad
, across Lake Bolmen from Sunnaryd to Bolmsö
, across Hamburgsund from Hamburgsund to Hamburgön
Högmarsö Ferry, from Högmarsö to Svartnö
, across Byälven from Högsäter to Fryxnäs
, across Storsjön from Isön to Norderön
, across Ivö Lake between Barum and Ivö Island
, across the Nordre älv between Kornhall and Brunnstorpsnäs
Kostersundet Ferry, across Kostersundet from Nordkoster to Sydkoster
, between the islands of Lyr and Orust
, between the islands of Malö and Orust
, across the Kalix river at Rödupp
, across the Slätbaken between Slottsholmen and Norrkrog
, across the Stora Le lake
Töreboda Ferry, across the Göta Canal in Töreboda
Torpön Ferry, across Lake Sommen from Torpön to Blåvik
Vaxholmen Ferry, from the town of Vaxholm to Vaxholm Castle
Ytterö Ferry, from Ytterön to Yttre park

Switzerland
, four routes across the Rhine in the city of Basel
, across the Rhine from Marthalen to Lottstetten in Germany
, across the Limmat river at Fahr Abbey

United Kingdom

Butts Ferry, across the River Exe in Exeter, Devon
Cowes Floating Bridge, across the River Medina on the Isle of Wight
Dartmouth Higher Ferry, across the River Dart in Devon
Hampton Ferry, across the River Avon near Evesham in Worcestershire
Hampton Loade Ferry, across the River Severn in Shropshire (closed 2016)
King Harry Ferry, across the River Fal in Cornwall
Normanton-on-Soar Chain Ferry, across the River Soar in Nottinghamshire
Reedham Ferry, across the River Yare in Norfolk
Sandbanks Ferry, across the entrance to Poole Harbour in Dorset
Stratford-upon-Avon Ferry, across the River Avon at Stratford-upon-Avon in Warwickshire
Symonds Yat river crossings, a pair of hand powered ferries across the River Wye in Herefordshire
Torpoint Ferry, across the River Tamar between Devon and Cornwall.
Trowlock Island Ferry, a hand powered ferry to Trowlock Island in the River Thames in south-western Greater London
Windermere Ferry, across Windermere in Cumbria

United States

Akers Ferry, across the Current River near Salem in Missouri
Avoca Island Ferry, across the intracoastal waterway to Avoca Island near Morgan City in Louisiana
Bemus Point-Stow Ferry, across Chautauqua Lake in New York
Buena Vista Ferry, across the Willamette River in Oregon
Canby Ferry, across the Willamette River in Oregon
Los Ebanos Ferry, across the Rio Grande between Los Ebanos, Texas and Gustavo Díaz Ordaz, Tamaulipas
Elwell Ferry, across the Cape Fear River in North Carolina
Fredericktown Ferry, closed in 2013 across the Monongahela River in southwestern Pennsylvania
 Green River Ferry, across the Green River in Mammoth Cave National Park
Hatton Ferry, across the James River in Virginia
Ironton Ferry, across an arm of Lake Charlevoix in Michigan
J-Mack Ferry, across an arm of the Sacramento River in California
Merrimac Ferry, across the Wisconsin River in Wisconsin
Merry Point Ferry, across the Corrotoman River in Virginia
Parker's Ferry, across the Meherrin River in North Carolina
Princeton Ferry, across the Sacramento River in California
 Reed's Ferry, across the Green River northeast of Rochester, KY
 Rochester Ferry, across the Green River in Rochester, KY
Sans Souci Ferry, across the Cashie River in North Carolina
Saugatuck Chain Ferry, across the Kalamazoo River in Michigan
Sunnybank Ferry, across the Little Wicomico River in Virginia
Sycamore Island Ferry, across the Potomac River in Maryland
Ticonderoga Ferry, across Lake Champlain between Ticonderoga, New York and Shoreham, Vermont
Upper Ferry, across the Wicomico River in Maryland
Valley View Ferry, across the Kentucky River in Kentucky
Wheatland Ferry, across the Willamette River in Oregon
White's Ferry, across the Potomac River in Maryland
Whitehaven Ferry, across the Wicomico River at Whitehaven, Maryland
Woodland Ferry, across the Nanticoke River in Delaware

Zambia
Chambeshi Ferry, across the Chambeshi River near Mbesuma
Kabompo Ferry, across the Kabompo River 80 km south-east of Kabompo
Kafue Ferry, across the Kafue River 4.5 km west of the Zambezi

Zimbabwe
Ekusileni Ferry, across the Insiza River downstream of Filabusi

See also

Aerial tramway
Cable car
Funicular
Pontoon (boat)
Punt (boat)
Pünte
Transporter bridge

References

External links

Twyford chain ferry on the River Trent, UK, 1899
Cable ferries operating in New Brunswick, Canada